Jean Robert Couturier (17 July 1911 – 2 February 1994) was a French basketball player. He competed in the men's tournament at the 1936 Summer Olympics.

References

External links
 

1911 births
1994 deaths
French men's basketball players
Olympic basketball players of France
Basketball players at the 1936 Summer Olympics
Sportspeople from Oise